Rodney "Boss" Bailey (born October 14, 1979) is a former American football linebacker who played in the National Football League (NFL). He was originally drafted by the Detroit Lions in the second round of the 2003 NFL Draft. He played college football at the University of Georgia. He is the brother of Hall of Fame NFL cornerback Champ Bailey.

Early life

Bailey earned honorable mention All-America honors from USA Today as a senior at Charlton County High School in Folkston, Ga.... Earned several prep honors, including being named to the Atlanta Journal Constitution's Top 50 in Georgia team.

Bailey played & started both sides of the ball. Playing quarterback on offense & Linebacker on defense as well as being the punter.

As a Junior, Bailey Posted 143 tackles, 3 sacks & 4 interceptions on defense. While also bringing in 1,079 rushing yards, 23 rushing touchdowns, 1,243 passing yards & 16 passing touchdowns on offense.

As a senior, Bailey finished with 129 Tackles, 2 sacks & 5 interceptions on defense. As well as posting 1,896 Rushing Yards, 27 Rushing Touchdowns, 1,562 passing yards & 16 Passing Touchdowns on offense

Bailey was also a track and field standout as he reached the 1996 & 1997 Class A State Championships in the 110-meter hurdles and received the track squad's Sprint Award... Brother, Champ, is in his fifth season playing cornerback for the Broncos... Boss and his wife, Crystal are the parents of two children Xavier Bailey , Sole’ Bailey. Rodney Bailey, who was nicknamed Boss by his grandmother, was born on Oct. 14, 1979, in Folkston, Ga.

College career

Bailey was a three-year starter at the University of Georgia, where he recorded 266 tackles (151 solo), 7.5 sacks, three forced fumbles, two interceptions, 11 pass breakups and three blocked kicks in 48 career games (35 starts)... Received first-team All-Southeastern Conference honors as a senior while also being named a semifinalist for the Butkus and Lombardi Awards that year, helping Georgia to victories in the SEC Championship Game and Sugar Bowl... Started every game at strongside outside linebacker as a senior, leading the team with a career-high 114 tackles (63 solo) and posting six sacks... Named second-team All-SEC in 2001... Did not play in 2000 after injuring his knee on the opening kickoff of season opener (received a redshirt year).

Professional career

Bailey appeared in 58 career games (51 starts), posting 265 tackles (204 solo), seven sacks (40.5 yds.) and two interceptions (32 yds.). He also registered 13 pass breakups, one forced fumble, one fumble recovery and seven special-teams tackles for his career.

Detroit Lions

2003~ Selected by Detroit in the second round (34th overall) of the 2003 NFL Draft, Bailey started all 16 games, posting a career-high 109 tackles (73 solo), 1.5 sacks (9.5 yds.), one interception (-2 yds.), four passes defensed, one forced fumble and one fumble recovery (returned 62 yards for a touchdown)... Received all-rookie honors from ESPN.com and Football Digest while being voted the club's Mel Farr Rookie of the Year... Posted nine tackles (8 solo) and had the first sack of his career (Chris Chandler) at Chi. (10/26)... Shared the team lead with nine tackles (5 solo) while adding a pass breakup and a forced fumble vs. Oak. (11/2)... Put together his best game of the season at Car. (12/21) with a career and team-high 13 tackles (11 solo) along with a 62-yard fumble return for a touchdown that marked his first career score... Earned Pepsi NFL Rookie of the Week honors for his efforts against the Panthers, and the 13 tackles put him over 100 for the season... Posted his first career interception and made six tackles (5 solo) vs. Stl. (12/28) in the season finale.

2004~ Bailey did not see any game action due to a knee injury suffered during training camp... Declared inactive for the first 13 games before he was placed on injured reserve on Dec. 16.

~ Aug 3rd.2004
Bailey went down during the Aug. 3rd training camp practice, and though initial reports were favorable, a week later his knee went under the knife to repair previously undetected cartilage damage.  "The damage was worse than anyone had realized from the tests," Lions coach Steve Mariucci said. "The doctor immediately repaired it, but Boss will be off the knee for several weeks, and then will be looking at a rehab period on top of that." Mariucci declined to put a timetable on Bailey's return, but said the Lions hope to have him back this season. Bailey would end up missing the entire 2004 season. As the 2005 season kicked off, Bailey was finally back in pads after a lengthy and frustrating rehab, and his potential began to shine through again, as he played solid through 10 games, ranking 3rd on the team in tackles. But an ankle injury in game 11 turned out to be more severe than expected, and he found himself going to IR for the second straight season in a row.

2005~ Bailey was Detroit's nominee for the Ed Block Courage Award after starting all 11 games played and placing third on the club with 75 tackles (48 solo)... Also had one sack (6 yds.), Two interception (one returned 34 yards for a touchdown), Four passes defensed and three special-teams stops... Placed on injured reserve with an ankle injury on Dec. 16... Started the season opener vs. G.B. (9/11) and posted 10 tackles (6 solo)... Added nine stops (6 solo), including one sack (6 yds.), at Chi. (9/18) before pacing the team with 10 tackles (7 solo) at T.B. (10/2)... Returned an interception 34 yards for a score, the second his career, vs. Car. (10/16)... Added eight tackles (7 solo) vs. Ari. (11/13) before leaving the game in the third quarter with an ankle injury... Tried to come back from the ankle injury, playing in two games, before he was placed on injured reserve on Dec. 16.

2006~ Bailey had 85 tackles (51 solo), one sack, three passes defensed and four special-teams tackles in 16 Starts with Detroit... Contributed at both the outside and middle linebacker positions (8 starts at strongside, 8 starts at middle)... Saw his first career action at middle linebacker vs. Sea. (9/10), posting six tackles and one sack... Added two special-teams tackles at Chi. (9/17)... Made his first start at middle linebacker at Stl. (10/1) and posted eight tackles (2 solo)... Led the Lions with a season-high 11 tackles (10 solo) at Min. (10/8)... Paced the club and tied his season-best tackle total of 11 vs. Buf. (10/15) for his second consecutive double-digit tackle performance.

2007~ Bailey registered a career-high 3.5 sacks (16 yds.) along with 74 tackles (44 solo), one pass breakup, one forced fumble and a personal-best six special-teams stops in 15 starts for the Lions... Played at the strongside linebacker position for 12 starts and Middle Linebacker for 3 starts ... Registered seven tackles (4 solo) at Oak. (9/9) before totaling eight stops and 1.5 sacks vs. Min. (9/16)... Had a season-high nine tackles (6 solo) and one pass defensed vs. Den. (11/4)... Had two tackles (2 solo) and three special-teams tackles vs. G.B. (11/22)... Declared inactive against Dallas (12/9) due to the flu... Returned to action at S.D. (12/16), recording eight tackles (4 solo)... Notched one sack and one forced fumble as part of a six-tackle (5 solo) effort vs. K.C. (12/23).

Denver Broncos
On March 6, 2008, Boss signed a five-year contract worth $17.5 million that included $8 million in guarantees over the first two seasons.

2008: Dressed but did not play (ankle) in the season opener at Oak. (9/8). If anything would have happened to the replacement starter Bailey was available, but Jamie Winborn played the whole game and made six tackles. "He held up out there very well," Bailey said. "I took advantage of it and got me an extra week."... Made his Broncos debut vs. S.D. (9/14) and tied for second on the team with five tackles (his brother, Champ, led with seven). It was the first time he had played alongside Champ in almost a decade (since 1998 when the brothers played at the University of Georgia)... Made nine tackles (5 solo) and had a quarterback pressure vs. N.O. (9/21)...Chipped in nine tackles and a quarterback pressure at K.C. (9/28) and recovered a fumble forced by CB Champ Bailey... Tied a career-high with 13 tackles (10 solo) and added a quarterback hurry vs. T.B. (10/5)... Recorded seven tackles (all solo) vs. Jac. (10/12)... Played just 11 snaps at N.E. (10/20) before injuring his knee. He was placed on the reserve/injured list on 10/22. Bailey was released on June 17, 2009.

NFL career statistics

References

External links
 Detroit Lions bio (archived)
 Georgia Bulldogs bio (archived)
 Player card at ESPN.com

1979 births
Living people
African-American players of American football
American football linebackers
Detroit Lions players
Denver Broncos players
Georgia Bulldogs football players
Players of American football from Georgia (U.S. state)
People from Charlton County, Georgia
21st-century African-American sportspeople
20th-century African-American sportspeople
Ed Block Courage Award recipients